This is a list of notable footballers who have earned 100 or more caps for Società Sportiva Lazio.

List of players

Players with 100 or more appearances for the club are listed by number of appearances. Appearances and goals are for all first-team competitive matches. Substitute appearances included. Bold denotes current players.

Statistics correct as of 18 March 2023.

Club captains

References

 Team website

Lazio
 
Association football player non-biographical articles